Mr Thing is a British hip hop producer. He is a former member of the Scratch Perverts. He has worked with such artists as Yungun, Doc Brown and Devise. Mr Thing was also the winner of the 2000 DMC UK DJ Championships, and the holder of the 1999 DMC World Team Championships as part of The Scratch Perverts.

Discography

Mix CDs
B Boys Revenge - History In The Makin - X:treme Records (1998)
Badmeaningood Vol. 4: Scratch Perverts - Ultimate Dilemma (2003)
Fabric Live 22 - Fabric (2005)
Fabric Big Issue CD (free with the Big Issue September 24, 2005)
The Kings Of Hip Hop CD 2 - Double Disc with DJ Premier on BBE Records (2005)
Champion Nerd (Free Download) (2010)

Singles
Come Get It with Time Scratch Perverts Records (25 October 2004)

Albums
 Yungun & Mr Thing - Grown Man Business (2006)

Compilations
Pistache Presents Beats'n'Rhymes Vol.1 mixed by DJ IQ

References

2. http://www.bonafidemag.com/mystro-mr-thing-x-bonafide-beats-05/ Mr Thing mix for Bonafide Magazine

Hip hop record producers
Living people
Year of birth missing (living people)